The 2TE25A main line two-unit diesel freight locomotive, rated at , with AC/AC transmission and individual axle traction control, is designed to haul freight trains on the Russian Federation lines RŽD with the broad gauge.

2TE25A diesel locomotive has been configured on the basis of the previously developed 2TE25K class Peresvet main line two-unit diesel freight locomotive of the same power rating and featuring AC/DC transmission and collector traction motors.
 Starting tractive effort — 2×441 kN
 Continuous tractive effort — 2×390 kN

See also
 History of rail transport in Russia
 2ES10, EP20 - another Russian new generation locomotives in serial production.

References

Co-Co+Co-Co locomotives
Diesel-electric locomotives of Russia
Railway locomotives introduced in 2006
5 ft gauge locomotives